Chasing Dogma is a comic book mini-series that chronicles the events of the two fictional stoners Jay and Silent Bob between two of their films: Chasing Amy and Dogma. Elements of the plot, such as the stealing of a monkey, were cannibalized and written into the film Jay and Silent Bob Strike Back, calling into question the comic book's canonicity. The series was written by Kevin Smith, creator of View Askew Productions. It was originally published by Oni Press in four issues as Jay & Silent Bob in 1998 and 1999, and later collected  in a trade paperback by Image Comics.

Plot
Jay and Silent Bob get the idea that if they go to the town of Shermer, Illinois, where most of John Hughes' movies take place, they could get chicks and be the "blunt connection". Along the way they encounter Holden McNeil, wildlife marshals, and monkeys.

Issue one
In the first issue, Jay and Silent Bob have been evicted from Tricia Jones's ("Trish the Dish," as seen in Mallrats) apartment, where they had lived for the previous six months. Jay causes this to happen after he tries to join Tricia in the shower. Unfortunately, this is all seen by a USA Today reporter, hoping to talk to her about her book, Boregasm.

After getting ejected, Jay and Bob go to and are soon told to leave the Eden Prairie Mall (also from Mallrats), Quick Stop/RST Video (from Clerks), and Comic Toast (as seen in Mallrats and a cut scene from Chasing Amy). The two, remembering various John Hughes movies, decide to go to Shermer, Illinois, where many of Hughes' movies are set. They get tickets, meet with Holden McNeil (an interaction depicted in the diner scene from Chasing Amy), and travel to Chicago via bus.

The issue also features various references to the View Askew films:
It is revealed that Willam Black (depicted in the form of Ethan Suplee from Mallrats) has yet to see the sailboat in the Magic Eye painting at the Eden Prairie Mall.
Roddy (Svenning's assistant from Mallrats) seems to be working for Channel Surfers at the Eden Prairie Mall.
While on the bus after they meet with Holden McNeil, Silent Bob is seen reading an issue of Bluntman and Chronic, suggesting he enjoys the comic unlike Jay.

Issue two
The pair are forced to flee the bus to Chicago after smoking a bowl in its bathroom. Having gotten off in Pittsburgh, the two decide to get a ride to a nearby town. After a near-fatal encounter with Mr. Rogers, Bob decides to get a new hat at a Mooby store. While Jay is waiting, he meets a pornographic actress. He convinces her that Jay and Bob should be in her current project, Doogie Nights. The two arrive at the set, a local hospital, to find that the director is former Doogie Howser television star Neil Patrick Harris. Wishing to make a "quasi-indie film", Neil gives Jay the job of fluffer. Jay, being too good at his job, leaves the actor unable to do a scene. Jay and Bob then leave the hospital, unhappy with the gift the porn star gave to him. Meanwhile, wildlife marshal Sam "Big Dog" Gavert starts a full search for the escaped zoo monkey Suzanne (shown in the closing shot of Mallrats). The monkey actually belongs to Provasic Pharmaceuticals, who are hoping to get their test subject back.

While waiting for Bob to get a new hat, Jay reads Bluntman and Chronic #2.

Issue three
The two wake up in Indiana to find Suzanne cupping Jay's penis. While Jay rants about how monkeys may eventually destroy humanity and rule the world, Bob ends up bonding with Suzanne. The three of them become hungry, and Jay decides to grab something to eat. Meanwhile, Big Dog and his team of wildlife marshals get a tip that the monkey is at an Indiana diner. At said diner, Jay, Bob, and Suzanne eat some grub. The wildlife marshals surround the diner and demand the release of Suzanne. Jay, Bob, and Suzanne (disguised as a kid) decide to come out. Big Dog falls for their disguise, until he smells bananas.

Jay and Bob escape with Suzanne into the sewer, where they are followed by Big Dog. The four end up at a huge dam pipe, where Suzanne tricks Big Dog into jumping over into the water. Hearing of Big Dog's fate, the team of marshals leave the trio alone when they emerge from the pipe. Jay and Bob hear that a Dr. Ogee at Provasic is offering a reward for Suzanne's capture. The two turn Suzanne in, get two bus tickets to Chicago as compensation and are on the road once again.

Issue four
The duo finally arrive in Chicago and enlist a cab to drive them to Shermer, Illinois. They end up at McHenry High School, where the two crash the Home Economics classroom and sell some weed to the students. At the school, Jay meets a lesbian student named Crystal, who embroiders Jay's catchphrase "Snoogans" onto his hat and explains the fictional status of Shermer. The two rival with the school dealers and end up in a sticky situation. After getting some new clothes, the two talk about going back to Tricia's place, but are distracted by the sounds of the local rock band, Fork'd Tongue. The two praise their playing and Jay buys a shirt from them. After hanging out with the band all night, Jay and Bob eat breakfast at a Mooby's restaurant and decide to stay in Chicago and get laid. They stop by the Planned Parenthood clinic to "meet loose women." After waiting all night, Bob hears something near the parking lot. The two investigate the problem, thus leading into Dogma.

Collected editions
The series was collected into a trade paperback:

Chasing Dogma (120 pages, Titan Books, April 2000, Image Comics, July 2001)

References

1998 comics debuts
View Askewniverse comics